Frank Soos (1950 – August 18, 2021) was an American short story writer.

Life
Soos grew up in Pocahontas, Virginia.
He graduated from Davidson College in 1972 and the University of Arkansas.
He taught at University of Alaska Fairbanks.

His work appeared in North Dakota Quarterly and Quarterly West.

Soos died in a bicycle accident in Maine on August 18, 2021.

Awards
National Endowment for the Humanities Fellowship
Flannery O'Connor Award for Short Fiction
Alaska State Writer Laureate

Works
Unpleasantries. University of Washington Press, Seattle, WA. 2016 (essays.) .

Anthologies

References

1950 births
2021 deaths
20th-century American male writers
20th-century American short story writers
21st-century American male writers
21st-century American short story writers
Accidental deaths in Maine
American male short story writers
Davidson College alumni
People from Pocahontas, Virginia
University of Alaska Fairbanks faculty
University of Arkansas alumni
Writers from Alaska
Writers from Virginia